The 2013 Michigan State Spartans football team represented Michigan State University in the Legends Division of the Big Ten Conference during the 2013 NCAA Division I FBS football season. Michigan State played their home games at Spartan Stadium in East Lansing, Michigan and were led by seventh year head coach Mark Dantonio. The Spartans finished the year 13–1, 8–0 and undefeated in Big Ten play. By winning the Legends Division, they earned a trip to the Big Ten Championship Game, their second appearance in the championship game. Facing No. 2-ranked Ohio State, they defeated the Buckeyes 34–24, knocking Ohio State out of the running for the BCS National Championship Game. The Spartans received an invitation to the Rose Bowl, their first trip to the Rose Bowl since 1988. There they defeated No. 5-ranked Stanford for the school's first Rose Bowl win since 1988.

Previous season

Michigan State's 2012 campaign was a letdown from the 2011 season. That year the Spartans went 11–3, continued a two-year undefeated streak at home, advanced to the inaugural Big Ten Championship Game, defeated SEC powerhouse Georgia in the Outback Bowl, and ended the season ranked No. 10/11 in the Polls. However, the departure of key offensive players—notably Kirk Cousins, Keshawn Martin, and B.J. Cunningham, who were all selected in the 2012 NFL draft—proved costly for the 2012 Spartans. After surging to a No. 10 ranking in both polls, the Spartans were favorites to be the Big Ten's representative for the Rose Bowl. A defeat at Spartan Stadium to Notre Dame snapped their home win streak and the Spartans stumbled into conference play with a come-from-behind win over Eastern Michigan, who ended the season 2–10. The Spartans went 3–5 in conference play, losing all of their home games. Those five losses were by a combined 13 points. The lone bright spot in that period came when Michigan State snapped a 21-game home winning streak for Wisconsin by beating the eventual Rose Bowl representatives, giving the Spartans their first win in Camp Randall Stadium since 2001. MSU only earned bowl eligibility by defeating Minnesota in the final game of the season. The Spartans accepted a bid to the Buffalo Wild Wings Bowl and there overcame a 13–0 halftime deficit to defeat TCU 17–16, led in part by backup quarterback Connor Cook.

Offensively, the Spartans were led by tailback Le'Veon Bell, who ended the regular season with 1,648 yards for 11 touchdowns, averaging 137.3 yards per game and earning 834 of his yards after contact. The Spartans were ranked ninth in the Big Ten for total offense, averaging 370.3 yards per game. Michigan State's offense managed only 21 touchdowns in 42 red zone trips this season and only 25 overall. Spartan quarterback Andrew Maxwell saw almost all the action that year, throwing for 2,578 yards and 13 touchdowns with a 53% completion rating. Backup quarterback Connor Cook only saw action in two games, going 5 for 6 with no touchdowns and one interception, which was returned for a score.

On the defensive side, Michigan State led the Big Ten, giving up 273.3 yards per game and 16.3 points per game. They ranked in the top 10 nationally for total defense, scoring defense, rushing defense, and passing efficiency and yardage defenses. Junior linebacker Max Bullough led the Spartans with 101 tackles, while William Gholston's 3.5 sacks and Darqueze Dennard's three interceptions were also team leaders. Senior cornerback Johnny Adams, who also had three interceptions, was unable to play in the bowl game due to an injury. The Spartans had 13 interceptions during the regular season, third best in the Big Ten.

Offseason

2013 NFL Draft
Three members of the 2012 Spartan football team were selected in the 2013 NFL Draft

In addition, five other former Spartans were taken as undrafted free agents:

Michigan State remained one of only seven teams to have had a player selected in each draft since the AFL/NFL merger.

Transfers out
 Juwan Caesar, Wide Receiver
 Jeremy Gainer, Defensive End, graduated and moved to Central Michigan University.
 Jay Harris, Wide Receiver 
 Kyle Kerrick, Wide Receiver

Returning players
Of the 22 starters from 2012, 16 returned for the 2013 campaign. The offense lost only two starters—Sims and Bell—while seven of the starting defensive players return. Junior punter Mike Sadler was the sole returning specialist. The Spartans retained their leaders in passing yards and touchdowns (Maxwell) and receiving yards and touchdowns (Fowler), but lost their leaders in rushing yards and touchdowns (Bell) and interceptions (Adams).

Early NFL departures
The three Spartans drafted were all early departures; Bell, Gholston, and Sims had all just finished their junior year. No other underclassmen declared for the draft.

Recruiting class

Season

Schedule

Game summaries

Western Michigan

 Sources:

Michigan State's 2013 campaign kicked off against Western Michigan with a Friday night battle at Spartan Stadium. Michigan State came into the game with a 10–2 all-time record against the Broncos, who were led by first-year head coach P. J. Fleck. This game was part of the "Celebrate the State" series pitting MSU against Eastern, Central, and Western Michigan over ten seasons. Coming into the game, the Spartans had not lost a home opener since 1998.

The game started with stifling defense. The Spartans were able to secure two first downs on their opening drive and were forced to punt. After both teams went three-and-out, the Broncos appeared to gain some momentum on their second drive. However, on third-and-eleven, Broncos quarterback Tyler Van Tubbergen's pass was intercepted by Jarus Jones. While being tackled, Jones lateraled the ball to Kurtis Drummond, who ran the remaining 21 yards for a touchdown. After both teams exchanged punts, Van Tubbergen again threw an interception. After the interception, Connor Cook took over the quarterbacking duties for the Spartans, but this drive also ended in a punt, as did the two after it. The Broncos took over with 11:31 left in the second quarter, and Van Tuubergen threw two incomplete passes in driving rain. At this point – 9:03 pm – the game was postponed due to lightning. The teams went to their locker rooms and would resume the contest 57 minutes later.

On their next drive, the Broncos were bolstered by a 45-yard pass from Van Tubbergen to Timmy Keith. After Van Tubbergen was hurt two plays later, redshirt freshman Zach Terrell threw a touchdown in his first career snap. While the Spartans had to punt on the ensuing possession, their next drive was aided by 25 yards of penalties from the Broncos and a 26-yard completion from Andrew Maxwell to Bennie Fowler. Jeremy Langford finished off the drive with a touchdown, but Spartan kicker Kevin Muma did not make the point after attempt. After the kickoff, the Broncos let the remaining 22 seconds in the half expire.

Michigan State's second drive of the new half was spurred by a 33-yard punt return by Andre Sims and put the Spartans on the Bronco three-yard line on third down. Unable to convert, the Spartans settled for a field goal by Muma. Michigan State ended up in a similar position two drives later. An interception by Jairus Jones put Michigan State at Western's 12 yard line, but they were unable to gain any yardage and had to settle for a second field goal. Two drives later, Langford fumbled and Bronco Corey Sueing recovered, which stopped a Spartan drive 21 yards from the end zone. However, the Broncos ensuing drive came to an end when Marcus Rush stripped the ball when sacking Terrell. Shilique Calhoun recovered the ball and ran 16 yards for Michigan State's second defensive touchdown. While the game was effectively finished at that point, the Broncos finished the game with a 56-yard touchdown drive, but Terrell was unable to convert the 2-point conversion. With two minutes remaining and no Broncos timeouts left, the Spartans knelt down to run out the clock and earn their first win.

Each team punted 11 times during the game. The Spartans offense combined for 297 yards – 181 from rushing and 118 from passing. Western had 204 offensive yards, but were limited to only 11 yards rushing. The Spartans' two quarterbacks combined for 17 completions on 37 attempts, while the two Broncos quarterbacks went 18 for 48. Terrell lead all quarterbacks with 120 yards and 2 touchdowns. While the Broncos only averaged 0.4 yards per rushing attempt, the Spartans averaged 4.3. Led by Jeremy Langford (94 yds, 1 TD, 1 fumble), the Spartans also had strong rushing performances by Cook (35 yds), Nick Hill (33 yds), and Riley Bullough (12 yds). WMU true freshman Corey Davis led both sides in receiving (8 catches, 96 yds, 1 TD). The Spartans had their worst passing game (3.1 yards per passing attempt) in the 80 games coached by Dantonio.

South Florida

 Sources:

Michigan State's second test was against the Bulls of the University of South Florida.

The offense struggled against a South Florida defense that had surrendered 53 points the week before to FCS McNeese State. Jeremy Langford scored the Spartans lone offensive touchdown on a 2-yard run in the 4th quarter. Shilique Calhoun scored two defensive touchdowns, the first coming in the second quarter, as Tyler Hoover stripped USF QB Bobby Eveld of the football at the USF 2 yard line where Calhoun scooped up the ball and scored. His second touchdown came in the third quarter as he intercepted a Bobby Eveld pass and returned the ball 56 yard for a pick six. Michigan State won 21–6, as the defense completely shutdown the South Florida offense.

Youngstown State

 Sources:

Michigan State's third game of the season was against the Penguins of Youngstown State University. The Spartans opened their 2011 season against Youngstown State, defeating the Penguins 28–6.

Connor Cook became the first Michigan State quarterback since Brian Hoyer to throw for 4 touchdowns in a game; all of Cook's touchdowns were thrown in the first half. The game was so out of hand in the second half that both Tyler O'Connor and Andrew Maxwell were both given playing time at the quarterback position. Standout performances from Nick Hill and Jeremy Langford proved big, as the Spartans rushed for 277 yards as a team, with 3 touchdowns. All in all, a big day for the offense lead the Spartans to a 55–17 victory over FCS opponent Youngstown State.

Notre Dame

 Sources:

Michigan State's final non-conference game was against the Fighting Irish of Notre Dame in a matchup for the Megaphone Trophy. Coming into the matchup, the Irish had won the previous two meetings between the schools.

Notre Dame struck first, scoring the only points in the opening quarter, as kicker Kyle Brindza nailed a 41-yard field goal. The Spartans took the lead in the second quarter, as Connor Cook found Macgarrett Kings in the corner of the end zone for a 12-yard touchdown pass to take the lead 7–3. Notre Dame would respond with a touchdown of their own after a pass interference penalty called against Trae Waynes on fourth and one put them deep in Michigan State territory. Several plays later, Irish quarterback Tommy Rees would find T.J. Jones in the back of the end zone for a two-yard touchdown pass to give the Irish a 10–7 lead at halftime.

The second half continued to be a low-scoring affair. Michigan State was able to tie the score in the 3rd quarter, as Freshmen kicker Michael Geiger made his very first field goal of his collegiate career from 25 yards, tying the game at 10 apiece. A turnover late in the third quarter proved costly for the Spartans, as on a halfback pass, true Freshmen R.J. Shelton threw an interception which swung momentum in Notre Dame's favor. The Irish re-took the lead for good in the fourth quarter on a Cam McDaniel seven-yard touchdown run. Geiger added a 42-yard field goal to make the score 17–13. The Spartans had an opportunity to take the lead in the closing minutes with one last drive. On their final drive, coach Mark Dantonio decided to pull a struggling Connor Cook (who had played every snap) in favor of the previous season's starter, Andrew Maxwell. The Spartans went four and out, Notre Dame took over on downs, and ran out the clock.

Michigan State suffered its first loss (and would end up being its only loss) of the year, falling to 3–1, while Notre Dame improved their record to 3–1. This was the Fighting Irish's third consecutive victory over the Spartans. Notre Dame and Michigan State would not play each other again until 2016.

In February, 2018, the NCAA announced that Notre Dame would be forced to vacate all wins from he 2013 season, including this victory over the Spartans, due to academic misconduct.

Iowa

 Sources:

After a bye week, the Spartans opened their conference schedule against the Hawkeyes of the University of Iowa. Iowa had won last year's meeting in East Lansing in double overtime by the score of 19–16.

After a scoreless 1st quarter, in which Michigan State turned the ball over on downs after failing a 4th down attempt, Michigan State scored first in the 2nd quarter after a lengthy drive ended with a Michael Geiger 27 yard field goal. Michigan State took a 3–0 lead. The Spartan defense forced an Iowa punt after a 3 play, 6 yard Iowa possession. The offense got the ball at their own 25. Connor Cook completed a pass to Bennie Fowler on 3rd and 6 for 12 yards to pick up a first down. The following play, Cook took off for an 11-yard run down to the Iowa 48. Several plays later, Jeremy Langford would pick up a blitz on 3rd and 8 which allowed Connor Cook to find Macgarrett Kings, who then avoided several defenders on his way to the end zone for 46 yard touchdown pass to put Michigan State up 10–0. Iowa would get the score within 3 after a Jake Rudock swing pass to Damon Bullock went 47 yards for a touchdown to make it 10–7. After the Hawkeye defense forced a punt, Iowa scored another touchdown on their next possession, this time in the form of a Rudock pass to big TE C.J. Fiedorowicz 10 yards out. Iowa would have a 14–10 lead going into halftime.

Michigan State received the ball to start the second half and re-took the lead on their opening possession. Connor Cook led the offense directly down the field and finished off the drive with a 37-yard bomb to Bennie Fowler for a touchdown to re-take the lead 17–14. Cook only threw one incompletion the entire drive. Michael Geiger would then add a 35-yard field goal to put the lead at 20–14 going into the 4th quarter.

In the 4th quarter, with it only being a 6-point game, Mark Dantonio called a fake punt on 4th and 4 as punter Mike Sadler ran for 25 yards to the Iowa 38 yard line to pick up the first down. As with most Spartan trick plays, coach Dantonio coined this one "Hey diddle, diddle, send Sadler up the middle". Michigan State would add another field goal, as Michael Geiger made his 3rd kick of the day, this time from 49 yards, to make the score 23–14. After Iowa missed a field goal attempt to bring the game within 6, Michigan State would add yet another field goal to their score on their next possession, with Michael Geiger converting his fourth field goal attempt, this one going for 45 yards. The score was now 26–14 Michigan State. On the very next Iowa possession, Darqueze Dennard would record his 2nd interception of the day, picking off Rudock on the very first play of the drive. With 4 minutes remaining in the game, Iowa got the ball back, but took too much time trying to score, and failed to score a touchdown on 4th and 5 from the Michigan State 16 yard line. The Spartans took over on downs and kneeled out the clock for their first conference win.

Connor Cook threw for a career-high (at the time) 277 yards as the Spartans overcame a 14–10 halftime deficit to win on the road in Iowa City.

Indiana

 Sources:

Michigan State's homecoming game will be against the Hoosiers of Indiana University. The winner of this game will earn the Old Brass Spittoon.

Purdue

 Sources:

The wet and cold fall weather would prove to be a factor for both teams during the game, as the Spartans and Boilermakers fought a low scoring game with half of the points scored coming from the defensive side of the ball. Spartan linebacker Denicos Allen returned a Purdue fumble 45 yards for the first touchdown of the day after Max Bullough hit Purdue quarterback Danny Etling hard in the second quarter. Purdue's offense was held scoreless thanks to a strong defensive effort by the Spartans, missed field goals of 51 and 41 yards, and an interception by Isaiah Lewis in the end zone. Michigan State would get the only offensive points for the day when the ball was lateraled to Tony Lippett who threw to an open TE Andrew Gleichert for a 5-yard score. Michigan State earned bowl eligibility with the win for the 7th straight year under coach Mark Dantonio.

Illinois

 Sources:

Michigan State closed out the first half of their conference schedule against the Illini of the University of Illinois. The last time the two schools met was in 2010, where the Spartans came out on top 26–6 en route to a share of the Big Ten title.

In a dominating performance on both sides of the football, Michigan State defeated Illinois in convincing fashion, by the score of 42–3. Connor Cook set a school record for passing efficiency, completing 15 of 16 passes for 208 yards and 3 touchdown passes. Jeremy Langford also compiled his 3rd consecutive 100 yard rushing performance, with 104 yards on 22 carries and 2 touchdowns.

The Spartan defense put on a dominant performance, with a key moment in the game coming in the 2nd quarter, as the Illini were on the Michigan State goal line with an opportunity to take the lead. In what would swing the momentum in favor of Michigan State, the Spartan defense made an impressive goal line stand, preventing them from scoring on 4th down. They also held Illinois to 128 yards of total offense, only surrendering 8 first downs all game, and held the Illini to 3 points—all of which were season lows. The Illini were averaging 35.3 points a game coming into this contest.

Michigan State improved their conference record to 4–0, 7–1 overall. This loss signified the 17th consecutive conference defeat for Illinois.

Michigan

 Sources:

Michigan State opened their November schedule against the Wolverines of the University of Michigan. The Paul Bunyan Trophy was on the line. Sloppy weather conditions marred the 106th annual meeting between the Michigan State Spartans and the Wolverines of Michigan.

Michigan had possession of the ball first, with Devin Gardner completing 2 passes right of the bat to Jeremy Gallon for 35 and 11 yards respectively. Michigan's drive stalled after Denicos Allen and Shilique Calhoun combined for a sack on Devin Gardner for a loss of 10 yards. Michigan would make a 49-yard field goal to go up 3–0. Michigan State's first offensive possession started off with an explosive play, as Connor Cook, scrambling to his right, threw a check down pass to fullback Trevon Pendleton, which went for 49 yards, putting them in Michigan territory. However, the Spartans were unable to convert on 3rd down and were forced to settle for a field goal, tying the game at 3 a piece. Neither team would have much success in the quarter after their initial offensive possessions, punting the ball back and forth throughout. The Spartan defense would record 4 sacks on Devin Gardner in the 1st quarter alone.

On the opening possession of the 2nd quarter, Connor Cook led the offense down to the Michigan 26 yard line before being denied on 3rd and 7. Freshmen kicker Michael Geiger would nail his second 40-yard field goal of the game, this time from 44 yards, to put the Spartans up 6–3. On the ensuing Michigan possession, Devin Gardner completed a 58-yard pass to TE Jehu Chesson to put the Wolverines in Michigan State territory, but the defense stood tall, forcing the Wolverines to kick a field from 39 yards, which Michigan kicker Brendan Gibbons (who in the previous matchup kicked the game-winning field goal as time expired to give Michigan their first win over Michigan State since 2007) was able to make. Michigan State would then receive the football with 3:22 remaining in the half. Connor Cook, much like the first possession of the quarter, led the offense down the field and with 23 seconds remaining in the half, found Bennie Fowler in the righthand corner of the end zone for a 14-yard touchdown pass. After converting the extra point, Michigan State held a 13–6 lead going into halftime.

The Spartans would receive the ball to start the second half, and they took advantage of it, as Connor Cook led the offense down the field before coming up short on 3rd and 11 after an 8-yard pass to Tony Lippett. Michael Geiger would make his 3rd field goal of the day, this time from 35 yards. Later in the quarter, Michigan cornerback Raymon Taylor would cause the first turnover of the game, picking off Connor Cook and returning it 17 yards to set the Michigan offense up with good field position. However, it was all for naught, as the Michigan State defense recorded a tackle for loss and 2 sacks on the following possession for the Wolverines. Michigan was forced to punt the ball and did not have a single positive yardage play the entire possession, as they had a total of 3 plays for −21 yards. With that came the end of the 3rd quarter.

The 4th quarter was all Spartans, as on the opening drive of the quarter, Connor Cook and Jeremy Langford led the offense all the way down to the 1 yard line of Michigan. Connor Cook would then take the ball in for a touchdown on a QB draw, which put Michigan State up 22–6; the extra point was blocked. On the next Michigan possession, Devin Gardner would try to get Michigan back in the game, driving the Wolverines all the way to the Michigan State 15 yard line before Darqueze Dennard intercepted a pass intended for Jeremy Gallon at the Spartan 3 yard line, thus putting a lid on any potential comeback. The Spartan offense would then widen the gap, as they ate up the clock, going on an 8 play, 97 yard drive that would take 3:40 off the clock. The drive concluded with a 40-yard rushing touchdown from Jeremy Langford, the longest of his career, to put Michigan State up 29–6 with 2:43 left. After apparently suffering an injury on the previous drive, Devin Gardner sat out for Michigan's final drive, as true Freshmen quarterback Shane Morris would come in for backup duty. Michigan failed to convert on 4th and 4, and turned the ball over to the Spartans. In a show of respect to Senior QB Andrew Maxwell, who was the starting quarterback the year before, coach Mark Dantonio allowed him to take one final snap as a Spartan against Michigan, as he took the final knee to end the game.

The Spartan defense, in a physically dominating performance, recorded 7 sacks on Michigan QB Devin Gardner and held the Wolverines to a program low −48 yards rushing, en route to an impressive 29–6 victory over their in-state rivals. Denicos Allen, Shilique Calhoun, and Ed Davis all recorded 2.5 sacks each. Jeremy Langford had his 4th consecutive 100 yard rushing performance, carrying the ball 26 times for 120 yards and a touchdown. Connor Cook went 18/33 for 252 yards, 2 touchdowns (1 passing, 1 rushing), and an interception. This was the largest margin of victory for the Spartans over the Wolverines since 1967, when Michigan State defeated Michigan 34–0, and their 5th victory over Michigan in the last 6 years. More importantly however, the Paul Bunyan Trophy returned to East Lansing.

Nebraska

 Sources:

After a bye week, the Spartans played against the Cornhuskers of the University of Nebraska. In a key Legends division matchup between Michigan State and Nebraska, in which a victory for either team would put them in the drivers seat for the division title, the Spartans would come out victorious 41–28, getting revenge for last years loss to the Cornhuskers in East Lansing.

On the opening drive, Nebraska running back Terrell Newby fumbled a pitch on an option play which was recovered by Michigan State. After Connor Cook overthrew a wide open Bennie Fowler in the back of the end zone, the Spartans had to settle for a field goal, giving them a 3–0 lead. On the ensuing Nebraska possession, QB Tommy Armstrong was intercepted by Kurtis Drummond. The Nebraska defense stood tall however, and forced a Michigan State punt. On the return, Nebraska punt returner Jordan Westerkamp muffed the catch and regained possession, but a tackle made by Kurtis Drummond jarred the ball loose and the Spartans recovered the fumble at the Nebraska 8 yard line. Michigan State was quick to capitalize, taking only 46 seconds to score on a R.J. Shelton 5 yard rushing touchdown, putting them up 10–0. Nebraska would respond with a 32-yard touchdown pass from Tommy Armstrong to Sam Burtch, the first touchdown the Spartan defense had allowed in 3 games. As the 1st quarter came to an end, Michigan State was holding on to a 10–7 lead.

Capping off a lengthy drive that began in the 1st quarter, Michigan State added another field goal to its score, going up 13–7. The remainder of the 2nd quarter was a battle of field position, as neither offenses could find their way into the red zone. However, with 2:32 remaining in the first half, Shilique Calhoun forced Tommy Armstrong to fumble the football deep in Nebraska territory, which was recovered by Michigan State. The Spartan offense, in what would be a recurring theme of the game, capitalized off of another Nebraska turnover, as Jeremy Langford carried several defenders into the end zone with him for a 6-yard rushing touchdown, putting Michigan State up 20–7 going into halftime.

In the 3rd quarter, Nebraska struck gold on its first possession of the second half after Michigan State was forced to punt on its opening drive. With the score 20–14, punter Mike Sadler pinned Nebraska down at their own 1 yard line after a 35-yard punt. On the first play of the possession, Tommy Armstong fumbled the ball, which was recovered by Trae Waynes at the Nebraska 3 yard line with 5:30 left in the quarter. Jeremy Langford would score on the first play, taking it in from 3 yards out to put the score at 27–14. Nebraska would score on the ensuing possession, going on an 11 play, 79 yard drive, which was capped off with a 38-yard touchdown pass from Tommy Armstrong to Kenny Bell.

At the start of the 4th quarter, the Spartan defense held up, forcing Nebraska to punt the ball. Michigan State's offense would start at their own 25 yard line. They were able to move the ball all the way to the Nebraska 31 yard line, but were unable to convert on 3rd and 5, as a Connor Cook pass to Jeremy Langford came up 1 yard short. With the game on the line, Mark Dantonio called a fake field goal attempt on 4th and 1, as Mike Sadler managed to get 3 yards on the fake to pick up the first down. After an Ineligible Downfield penalty, Michigan State faced 3rd and 18. Jeremy Langford was able to pick up a blitz on the very next play, giving Connor Cook the time to find Keith Mumphery for a 27-yard touchdown pass. With 5:46 remaining, Michigan State took a 34–21 lead. The Spartan defense would then force Nebraska to punt the ball. On the ensuing Spartan possession, the offense grinded down the clock, tiring out the Nebraska defense. The drive ended after Jeremy Langford scored his 3rd touchdown of the day as he ran all the way to the end zone 37 yards out. Nebraska would score a touchdown with 10 seconds left, but the game was well out of reach at that point.

With 32 carries for 152 yards and 3 touchdowns, Jeremy Langford recorded his 5th straight 100 yard rushing performance, increasing his rushing totals to 926 yards and 199 carries. With this victory, Michigan State took a commanding lead in the Legends division as they improved their conference record to 6–0, 9–1 overall. With a loss, Nebraska fell to 4–2 in conference, 7–3 overall.

Northwestern

 Sources:

In their penultimate match-up of the season, the Spartans would face the Wildcats of Northwestern University. Northwestern defeated MSU in East Lansing the previous season, 23–20. Securing a victory in this game would earn Michigan State its 2nd Legends Division title in 3 years.

The 1st quarter featured both offenses going on lengthy drives, but were unable to score much, as of the 2 teams, Northwestern was only able to score a field goal, giving them a 3–0 leading going into the 2nd quarter. Offensively, the Spartans gained some momentum on their opening drive of the 2nd quarter in which Jeremy Langford carried the ball 8 times, the last of which was a 20-yard rush for a touchdown to put Michigan State up 7–3. After the Spartan defense forced a punt, the offense would get the ball back at their own 8 yard line. On 3rd and 5, Bennie Fowler bobbled a pass from Connor Cook over the head of 2 defenders, regained possession of the ball and scored on an 87-yard pass (the longest scoring play of the season for Michigan State) to give MSU a 14–3 lead. Northwestern would answer right back, making a field goal on their next possession to cut the deficit to 12. The score was 14–6 going into halftime.

The Spartans received the ball first to start the 2nd half and scored on a 37-yard field goal from Michael Geiger, putting the score at 17–6. Michigan State would further add to its score on their next possession, going 8 plays, 87 yards on drive that was capped off with a 15-yard play action pass from Connor Cook to Josiah Price, giving the Spartans a 23–6 lead; the PAT was blocked. The Spartans would score once more in the 4th quarter on a Jeremy Langford 37 yard touchdown run. Michigan State won 30–6.

The Spartan defense recorded 3 interceptions and Connor Cook threw for a then career-high 293 yards, completing 16/23 passes for 2 TDs. Jeremy Langford recorded his 6th consecutive 100 yard rushing game on 25 carries, 150 yards rushing, and 2 TDs. Michigan State secured a spot in the 2013 Big Ten Football Championship Game, in the process winning their 2nd Legends Division title in 3 years.

Minnesota

 Sources:

The Spartans closed out their regular season against the Golden Gophers of the University of Minnesota. Michigan State defeated Minnesota the previous year in the final game of the season to gain bowl eligibility.

After forcing a Minnesota punt on their opening possession, Michigan State would score first, putting together a 7-play, 80 yard drive that concluded with a Jeremy Langford run of 15 yards, giving Michigan State a 7–0 lead. On the ensuing Minnesota possession, Trae Waynes would record his first interception of the season, giving the ball right back to the offense. The offense, however, was unable to score and was forced to punt. The first quarter concluded with a 7–0 Michigan State lead, as neither team was able to score after the initial Michigan State possession. Not much would change in the 2nd quarter as the only score was a 21-yard field goal made by Minnesota kicker Chris Hawthorne to make the score 7–3 going into halftime. Both teams had an opportunity to score before halftime, but Minnesota QB Phillip Nelson and Connor Cook both threw interceptions in their opponents territory.

The general offensive stagnation came to an end on Michigan State's opening drive, as Connor Cook led the MSU offense down the field for a touchdown, connecting with Josiah Price for a 12-yard touchdown pass. Michigan State would take a 14–3 lead and never look back. Neither team would score for the remainder of the game in what would go down as a defensive slug fest.

Jeremy Langford rushed for 134 yards on 24 carries and scored one of the games only touchdowns, in the process tying the school record for most consecutive 100 yard rushing performances with 7. Michigan State recorded their 3rd 11th win season in 4 years. Michigan State became the first Big Ten team to win all eight conference games by double digits since the conference went to an eight-game schedule in 1971. They also became the first unbeaten Big Ten team to win all of its conference games by double-figures since Michigan in 1943 (6–0).

Ohio State (Big Ten Championship Game)

 Sources:

In a rematch of a very close game last year in East Lansing, the Leaders division champion Ohio State Buckeyes would face the Legends division champion Michigan State Spartans in the Big Ten Championship Game. Michigan State made its second appearance in the conference championship game, having lost to Wisconsin in the inaugural title game. A lot was on the line, as Ohio State came into the game on a 24-game winning streak and was ranked No. 2 in the BCS standings. With a win, Ohio State was practically guaranteed a spot in the 2014 BCS National Championship Game. In Michigan State's case, they were seeking their first BCS bowl bid ever. The Spartans were also seeking their first Rose Bowl appearance since 1988 where they defeated USC 20–17. Although Michigan State technically would have been able to get invited to the Rose Bowl even if they lost (as long as they were ranked within the top 14 in the BCS standings), the Spartans wanted to win the Big Ten outright. Needless to say, motivation and incentive for both teams were high. Ohio State would win the coin toss and defer possession until the second half.

Several Ohio State Pass Interference penalties kept the Michigan State offense on the field on the opening drive, where the Spartans stalled at the Buckeye 23 yard line after two consecutive Connor Cook incompletions. Michael Geiger put MSU up 3–0 after making a 40-yard field goal. The remainder of the 1st quarter was a defensive struggle, as neither team could manage to get into opposing territory. The score was 3–0 going into the 2nd quarter; Ohio State was held scoreless in the 1st quarter for the first since playing Penn State the previous season.

On the very first play of the second quarter, Connor Cook hit Keith Mumphery for 72-yard touchdown pass (the second longest scoring play all season for the Spartans) to put Michigan State up 10–0. Michigan State would add to its lead on their very next possession as Connor Cook hit Tony Lippett in the corner of the endzone on a 33-yard pass, giving the Spartans a 17–0 lead. Trailing 17–0, Braxton Miller led Ohio State on its first scoring drive which ended after Miller found Corey "Philly" Brown over the top of the Michigan State defense on a 20-yard touchdown pass, cutting the deficit to 10. After the two teams traded possessions, Ohio State got the ball back with 1:23 remaining in the first half. The Buckeyes drive did not start off as planned, as on the very first play, Shillique Calhoun and Max Bullough combined for a sack which resulted in a loss of six. On the very next play, Braxton Miller got the majority of that lost yardage back with a 15-yard run. With 13 seconds left in the half, after a Michigan State timeout, Miller completed a 38-yard pass to TE Jeff Heuerman to put Ohio State in good field goal position at the MSU 11 yard line. Senior kicker Drew Basil converted a 20-yard field goal attempt as time expired to bring the Buckeyes within a touchdown going into halftime, giving them momentum going into the second half in which they would receive the ball first. At the end of the first half, Michigan State led 17–10.

The physical running attack of Ohio State would be the theme of the third quarter, as Buckeye RB Carlos Hyde, who had been relatively quiet up until that point, started to gain traction. The duo of Hyde and Miller rushed for a combined 64 yards on the opening Ohio State possession of the second half, and Miller tied the game on an 11-yard rushing touchdown, making the score 17–17. On the ensuing Michigan State possession, Connor Cook threw only his fifth interception of the season (which would end up being the only turnover of the game), giving the ball back to the Ohio State offense with a short field. Despite this, the Spartan defense, who came into the game ranked No. 1 in total defense, got a critical stop, forcing Ohio State to punt the ball. The Buckeye defense then forced a three and out after the Ohio State special teams pinned the ball down at the MSU four yard line. After a decent return, Ohio State started their drive in MSU territory. Taking advantage of the short field, Carlos Hyde and Braxton Miller imposed their will again, as Miller scored his second rushing touchdown of the game from six yards out to give Ohio State a 24–17 lead. Desperately needing a score after 24 unanswered Ohio State points, the Michigan State offense took the field. On a drive that featured a huge 33-yard run by Jeremy Langford and a key conversion on fourth and two on an option run play, Michael Geiger kicked a 44-yard field goal to bring Michigan State within four points. The third quarter ended with Ohio State leading 24–20.

High drama ensued in the fourth quarter. After an Ohio State punt opened the quarter, the Michigan State offense went on an eight play, 90-yard drive that ended after Connor Cook completed a nine-yard touchdown pass to TE Josiah Price, who was wide open in the left side of the endzone. With the score, the Spartans took the lead back from Ohio State, 27–24. With under eight minutes remaining in the game, a Mike Sadler punt was partially blocked by Ryan Shazier (an All-Conference linebacker for the Buckeyes), which caused the punt to only net 19 yards. Braxton Miller and the Ohio State offense took over with 7:36 remaining at the MSU 47-yard line. Knowing they had to get a critical stop, the Michigan State defense stood tall, as on 4th and 2, Spartan linebacker Denicos Allen beat his blocker and prevented Braxton Miller from converting the first down on a speed option play. Michigan State took over on downs and, several plays later, Jeremy Langford put the game out of reach on a 26-yard touchdown run, giving Michigan State a 34–24 lead and became the first 100-yard rusher the Ohio State defense had allowed all season. Down 10 with 2:16 remaining, Ohio State failed to convert on 4th and 10 after four consecutive Braxton Miller incompletions. Michigan State took over on downs and ran out the clock, with the final score being 34–24.

Ohio State's dream of playing for a National Championship came to an end, as did their 24-game winning streak. Michigan State won their first outright Big Ten Championship since 1987 and secured their first Rose Bowl appearance in 26 years. Connor Cook was named MVP, throwing for a then career-high 304 yards, completing 24 of 40 passes and three touchdowns. Jeremy Langford rushed for over 100 yards rushing for the eighth straight game, breaking the school record for most consecutive 100 yard rushing games, a record set back in 1985 by MSU great Lorenzo White. He also finished the regular season leading the Big Ten in rushing touchdowns (17). This win also signified the first 12 win season in school history.

Stanford (Rose Bowl)

 Sources:

Statistics
Passing
Note: Comp/Att = Completions/Attempts; Pct. = Completion percentage; Pass Rat. = Passer Rating

Rushing

Receiving

Kicking
Note: XPM = Extra point made; XPA = Extra point attempt; XP% = Extra point percentage; FGM = Field goal made; FGA = Field goal attempt; FG% = Field goal percentage; LNG = Longest make

Punting

Punt Returns

Kick Returns

Defense
Note: TT = Total tackles; Sol = Solo tackles; Ast = Assisted tackles; TFL = Tackles for loss; FF = Forced fumbles; FR = Fumble recoveries; PD = Passes defended; INT = Interceptions

Rankings

Roster

References

Western Michigan University

South Florida

Michigan State
Michigan State Spartans football seasons
Big Ten Conference football champion seasons
Rose Bowl champion seasons
Michigan State Spartans football